Diloxia is a genus of snout moths (family Pyralidae). It was described by George Hampson in 1896, and is known from Madagascar and India.

Species
 Diloxia belohalis Marion & Viette, 1956
 Diloxia euteles West, 1931
 Diloxia fimbriata Hampson, 1896
 Diloxia isocypha Meyrick 1938

References

Pyralinae
Pyralidae genera
Taxa named by George Hampson